Archbishop Sahag II Mashalian, also known as Sahak Mashalyan in Eastern Armenian transliteration (born 17 March 1962) became the 85th Armenian Patriarch of Constantinople in 2019.

The Armenian Patriarchate of Constantinople is one of the four Sees of Armenian Apostolic Church (the other three being the Mother See of Holy Etchmiadzin, the Holy See of Cilicia and the Armenian Patriarchate of Jerusalem) and has an autocephalous status, accepting, on the other hand, spiritual supremacy of the Catholicos of Armenia and of all Armenians in Holy Echmiadzin.

Patriarch Sahak II was born as Shahan Mashalian in Istanbul, Turkey on 17 March 1962.

During the patriarchal election, the Turkish government banned candidates from abroad. Therefore, only two candidates participated in the elections–Mashalian and Archbishop Aram Ateshyan—both of whom are considered close to the Turkish government. The new, disputed Armenian Patriarch of Istanbul slammed the US Senate recognition of the Armenian Genocide although he himself hails from a family of Armenian Genocide survivors.

References

1962 births
Armenian Patriarchs of Constantinople
Turkish people of Armenian descent
Armenian Oriental Orthodox Christians
21st-century Oriental Orthodox archbishops
Living people
Clergy from Istanbul